"On the Loose" is a song recorded by Irish singer and songwriter Niall Horan from his debut studio album Flicker. It was written by Horan, John Ryan and its producer Julian Bunetta. The song was released to the US Mainstream Top 40 radio on 20 February 2018 as the album's fourth single. An alternate version was released on 16 February 2018.

Background
Horan debuted the song on 13 May 2017 during his performance at Channel 93.3's Summer Kick Off concert in San Diego. On 29 May 2017, Horan performed on The Today Show's Citi Concert Series, closing the show with a live TV debut of "On the Loose".

Horan admitted in an interview with Herald Sun that he channelled Fleetwood Mac for the song. "You can hear the 'Mac in that. Everyone's always trying to write their own Dreams. I'm only 24, Fleetwood Mac is the music I've listened to since I was four years old. I listen to a lot of other types of music but that's the stuff that always stuck around with me. I was going through a punk rock phase when I was 15, I like punk rock now but I wouldn't pick up my iPod and go straight to it, I'd probably go to the 'Mac and Crosby Stills and Nash and Jackson Browne and Tom Petty. They're the artists in my head, you can hear that on the album I think."

He announced on 5 February 2018 via social media that the song would be the fourth single from the album. The accompanying single artwork, illustrated by Kyler Martz, features a drawing of a woman holding a heart, surrounded by flowers, some of which have legs and eyes on them. An animated lyric video for the song was released on 12 February 2018, after Horan posted a 20-second teaser the day before. It features a lady seducing multiple men, while cruising through a city in a convertible.

Critical reception
Christina Lee of Idolator wrote that the song "sounds like a cautionary tale", in comparison to "Slow Hands". Mike Wass of the same publication opined that the song is "similarly upbeat" as "Slow Hands", and found it "more radio-friendly" than Horan's "stripped-back songs".

Track listing

Personnel
Credits adapted from Tidal.
 Niall Horan – vocals, guitar
 Julian Bunetta – production, background vocals, percussion, record engineering
 Nathan Dantzler – master engineering
 Tommy King – keyboard
 Michael Freeman – assistant mixing
 Matt Chamberlain – drums
 Mark Goldenberg – guitar
 Val McCallum – guitar
 Spike Stent – mixing

Charts

Weekly charts

Year-end charts

Release history

References

2018 singles
2017 songs
Niall Horan songs
Capitol Records singles
Songs written by Niall Horan
Songs written by John Ryan (musician)
Pop ballads
Pop rock songs
Songs written by Julian Bunetta